The Mount, Nottswood Hill, is a grade II listed house near Blaisdon in Gloucestershire. The house is thought to have been rebuilt in the later nineteenth century as a summer home for a Gloucester solicitor. It is described by the authors of the Victoria County History as an "ornamental cottage" and by others as being in the Arts and Crafts style.

References 

Grade II listed houses in Gloucestershire
Arts and Crafts architecture in England
Forest of Dean
Blaisdon